Al Hilal (in Arabic: نادي الهلال) is a Saudi professional basketball club based in the city of Riyadh in the Riyadh Province, Saudi Arabia that plays in the Saudi Premier League. Currently, Al Hilal also plays in the West Asia Super League.

Honours

Domestic 
Saudi Premier League (5):
1977, 1990, 1992, 1993, 1994, 2022
Alnokhbah Championship (5):
1994, 1995, 1997, 1999, 2008

International 
Arab Club Basketball Championship

 Third Place (1): 1996

Notable players

 Ahmed Samater
 Mark Lyons
 Clint Chapman

References

External links
Team profile at Asia-Basket.com

Basketball teams established in 1957
Basketball teams in Saudi Arabia
Sport in Riyadh